Scutellinia is a genus of cup-fungi in the family Pyronemataceae. The genus is widely distributed, especially in the Northern Hemisphere, and according to the Dictionary of the Fungi (10th edition, 2008), contains 66 species.

Species

Scutellinia ahmadiopsis 
Scutellinia armatospora
Scutellinia badioberbis
Scutellinia barlae
Scutellinia cejpii
Scutellinia citrina
Scutellinia colensoi
Scutellinia crinita
Scutellinia crucipila
Scutellinia decipiens
Scutellinia erinaceus
Scutellinia jejuensis
Scutellinia kerguelensis
Scutellinia legaliae
Scutellinia lusatiae
Scutellinia macrospora
Scutellinia marginata
Scutellinia minor
Scutellinia minutella
Scutellinia mirabilis
Scutellinia nigrohirtula
Scutellinia olivascens
Scutellinia paludicola
Scutellinia patagonica
Scutellinia pennsylvanica
Scutellinia pilatii
Scutellinia pseudotrechispora
Scutellinia scutellata
Scutellinia setosa
Scutellinia sinensis
Scutellinia subbadioberbis
Scutellinia subhirtella
Scutellinia superba
Scutellinia totaranuiensis
Scutellinia trechispora
Scutellinia tuberculata
Scutellinia umbrorum
Scutellinia vitreola

References

Pyronemataceae
Pezizales genera